Poliya Composite Resins and Polymers, Inc. (Poliya) was founded in 1983 and specializes in developing and manufacturing polymers and composite resins. Poliya's headquarters are located in Istanbul, Turkey with other Poliya locations and manufacturing facilities in Turkey and Russia. 

As of 2022, Poliya is listed in the Top 500 largest companies of Turkey. Most widely known for their flagship product, Polijel high performance gelcoat series, the company also manufactures UPE-polyester resins, vinyl ester resins, pigment color pastes, solid surface chips, adhesives, bonding pastes, mold release agents and waxes. Poliya's diverse product portfolio makes it a thriving international company.  As the industry leader, Poliya serves 25 countries throughout the world and is the fastest-growing composite resin manufacturer in Europe.
 
Poliya's main focus continues is research and development while remaining at the forefront of environmental consciousness. The company is a member of the European Chemical Industry Council (Cefic), Turkish Chemical Manufacturers Association, and the Turkish Composites Manufacturers Association.

History
Ismet Cakar, a chemical engineer, began making early contributions to polyester resin modification and gelcoat UV stabilizers. Cakar worked on polymerization and resins at Ilkester, leaving to found a start-up. In 1983, Cakar launched the company that would become Poliya. Early on, Poliya recognized that composite materials would need special functions under different usage conditions (UV resistant, chemical resistant, etc.), and these composite resins would be required in various low weight and corrosion resistant applications which would require similar modification technology.

Research

  

Poliya contributes scientific research and local industrial activities in Turkey which has a short history starting in 1980s. Most recently Poliya sponsored the first TURK-KOMPOZIT 2013 Composites Event. Other research and events include Polymeric Composites Symposium, Exhibition and Workshops. Sakarya University Advanced Applied Technologies  – Saugar X7 and Sahimo projects as well as Yildiz Technical University AE2 Project and many others to support students and colleges. Also Poliya took place in TUBİTAK-TEYDEP Technology and Innovation Support Programs. Poliya also took part in Industrial Partnership Program designed by TUBITAK-MAM and supported by World Bank About nano composites research, Poliya in partnership with Technische Universität Hamburg-Harburg and IYTE has created a joint project  and published various scientific articles about polyester resin and carbon nano tubes for the advancement of nano composite knowledge. Another joint project created by Poliya and Dokuz Eylül University, Institute of Marine Sciences and Technologies of scientific studies was about use of Biocides and silver ions with Polijel gelcoats in the marine environment.

Organization
Poliya's core businesses focus on composite performance materials, composite adhesives, composite coatings, solid surface materials, pigment color pastes and release agent technologies, which have been supplemented through several notable expansions. It has also divested itself of less profitable segments.

Composite performance materials
Combining Polipol polyester resins and Polives vinyl ester resin as well as gelcoat products, Composite performance materials provides products for the construction, transport, marine, defense, wind energy, sports equipment, chemical containment industries. Main manufacturing plant is located in Southeastern Europe, Cerkezkoy-Turkey.

References

Chemical companies of Turkey
Composite materials
Manufacturing companies based in Istanbul
Companies established in 1983